The Passmore House is a historic house at 846 Park Avenue in Hot Springs, Arkansas.  It is a large -story wood-frame structure, with a seven-bay facade topped by a mansard roof with a crested surround and elaborately styled dormers.  A central two-story pavilion projects, with a double-door entrance on the first floor, and French doors on the second level that open to a shallow lattice balcony.  The house was built in 1873 for Dr. Pauldin Passmore, one of Hot Springs's first doctors, who benefitted from the locality's popularity as a site for the treatment of medical conditions.

The house was listed on the National Register of Historic Places in 1976.

See also
National Register of Historic Places listings in Garland County, Arkansas

References

Houses on the National Register of Historic Places in Arkansas
Second Empire architecture in Arkansas
Houses completed in 1873
Houses in Hot Springs, Arkansas
National Register of Historic Places in Hot Springs, Arkansas
1873 establishments in Arkansas